Come On, Get Happy: The Partridge Family Story is a 1999 American made-for-television biographical film about the 1970–1974 television series The Partridge Family, focusing on star David Cassidy and co-star Danny Bonaduce through the four years the show was on. Directed by David Burton Morris and written by Jacqueline Feather, the 90-minute film premiered on November 13, 1999 at 8:00pm on ABC.

Synopsis
The story is told from the viewpoint of Danny Bonaduce, narrated by Bonaduce himself and played on-screen by a pre-Desperate Housewives Shawn Pyfrom. Upon landing the coveted role of Danny Partridge, young Bonaduce must contend with the jealousy of his abusive father Joseph (William Russ); all the while, Danny is a sidelines observer of the effect that overnight stardom has on his co-worker David Cassidy (Rodney Scott), who despises all the idolatry and yearns for a normal life.

The film recounts the surrogate son-surrogate father relationship between Danny and actor Dave Madden (Michael Chieffo), who was genuinely fond of his younger costars despite the kid-hating irascibility of his "Reuben Kincaid" character.

Cast
Shawn Pyfrom as Danny Bonaduce
Rodney Scott as David Cassidy
Eve Gordon as Shirley Jones
Kathy Wagner as Susan Dey
Michael Chieffo as Dave Madden
William Russ as Joseph Bonaduce
Roxanne Hart as Betty Bonaduce
Richard Fancy as Harold
Willie Garson as Sam
Mark Harelik as Alex
Danny Bonaduce as Narrator
Tara Blanchard as Suzanne Crough
J.B. Gaynor as Jeremy Gelbwaks
Scotty Leavenworth as Brian Forster
Shane Newell as Kid on Bike

See also
The Partridge Family

References

External links 
 

The Partridge Family
1999 television films
1999 films
1990s biographical films
American television films
American biographical films
Biographical films about actors
Films about musical groups
Films about television
Films based on television series
Films directed by David Burton Morris
Films scored by Guy Moon
1990s English-language films
1990s American films